Walnut Grove Cemetery is a historic cemetery at Grove and Railroads Streets in Methuen, Massachusetts. The cemetery was established in 1853, and was laid out in the then-popular rural cemetery style. The Tenney Memorial Chapel given by the Daniel G. Tenney in 1927 as a memorial to his parents Charles H. Tenney and Fannie Haseltine (Gleason) Tenney. The chapel was designed by architect Grosvenor Atterbury. The earliest burial is estimated to be about 1850; whereas the number of burials before 1960 is unknown, there have been 896 burials since 1960.

The cemetery was added to the National Register of Historic Places in 1984.

See also
 National Register of Historic Places listings in Methuen, Massachusetts

References

External links
 

Cemeteries on the National Register of Historic Places in Massachusetts
Buildings and structures in Methuen, Massachusetts
Cemeteries in Essex County, Massachusetts
National Register of Historic Places in Methuen, Massachusetts
Rural cemeteries
Cemeteries established in the 1850s
1853 establishments in Massachusetts